Analytic Services Inc., better known by its acronym ANSER, is a not-for-profit corporation that provides services, largely to the U.S. federal government, in several mission areas.  Its headquarters are in Falls Church, Virginia.

As of 2017, Analytic Services Inc. has 227 employees.

History

1950s–2000 
Incorporated in California in 1958 as a not-for-profit corporation, ANSER was originally established to support the United States Air Force. It began operations with 25 technical and ten support staff members in September of that year. Shortly after it was established, it became a Federal Contract Research Center (FCRC), one of nine such organizations including RAND, Aerospace Corporation, MITRE, CNA, and MIT Lincoln Laboratory.

Stanley Lawwill was selected by the Board of Directors to be the company's first president; he served from 1958 to 1981. After starting out in temporary quarters in Alexandria, Virginia, ANSER moved to permanent offices in Falls Church, Virginia in 1960. Throughout the 1960s, ANSER's staff performed research and analysis to help the Air Force make decisions about strategic missiles, attack aircraft and fighters, navigation systems, and "over-the-horizon" radar.

Releasing its FCRC designation in 1976, ANSER began to work for other United States Department of Defense components, and select federal agencies. With a staff that had grown to 156 members, in 1978 the company moved to new quarters at 400 Army-Navy Drive, within view of the Pentagon. Upon Lawwill's retirement, Jack Englund (1981–1991) was elected president of the company. ANSER continued to research projects for the Air Force, while also diversifying into health systems and the protection of radioactive materials.

To support its growing work with the Air Force Space Command, in 1983, the company expanded its footprint by opening an office in Colorado Springs. By the time John Fabian (1991–1998) was named ANSER's third president, the company had grown to over 400 staff members. Fabian was a former military pilot and astronaut who had served as a mission specialist on the Space Shuttles Discovery and Challenger. On the Challenger mission in 1984 a crewmember was Sally Ride, who became the first American woman in space. The company had already developed contacts with the Russian space program in the 1980s, and in 1992 established a satellite office in Moscow known as the Center for International Aerospace Coordination, making it the first U.S. defense firm to open such an office in Russia.

2000s–present 
In March 2001, ANSER moved to new offices in Shirlington. Shortly before, Ruth David (1998–2015) had been selected as its fourth president. ANSER moved into "homeland security" projects that year. In the spring of 2001, the company invested its personnel and assets to create the ANSER Institute for Homeland Security, making it well-positioned for contracts after the events of 9/11 that year. The Homeland Security Act of 2002 called for the establishment of a federally funded research and development center (FFRDC), to be called the Homeland Security Institute (HSI). In 2004, ANSER won the contract to host HSI, a think tank devoted to addressing national policy and security issues where scientific, technical, and analytical expertise is required.

In the decade that followed, the company experienced increased revenues and substantial growth in its workforce. In addition to analyzing a wide range of homeland security threats, ANSER also developed a forensics capability for the United States Armed Forces, developing antiterrorism communications for the Army, and helping plan and develop the U.S. Vietnam War Commemoration.

In 2013, the company relocated to Skyline, just a short distance from a building it had occupied 35 years before. Upon David's retirement in 2015, Carmen Spencer was selected as fifth president and CEO. His background in chemical/biological defense expanded the corporation's position in this arena. Spencer led a push to achieve a longtime ANSER objective, the acquisition of a company that would diversify its reach. In January 2017, ANSER purchased Advanced Technology International (ATI) of Summerville, South Carolina, a non-profit entity that organizes and manages research and development consortia on behalf of the Federal Government. That same year, ANSER was named to Bloomberg's top 100 ranking of Federal contractors based on prime contracts awarded in the past fiscal year.

References

External links
 Official website
 Bloomberg Company Overview of Analytic Services Inc.

Organizations based in Virginia
Falls Church, Virginia
Non-profit corporations
Research institutes established in 1958
1958 establishments in California